The Emporium, from 1980 to 1995 Emporium-Capwell, was a mid-line department store chain headquartered in San Francisco, California, which operated for 100 years—from 1896 to 1996. The flagship location on San Francisco's Market Street was a destination shopping location for decades, and several branch stores operated in the various suburbs of the Bay Area. The Emporium and its sister department store chains were acquired by Federated Department Stores in 1995, and many converted to Macy's locations.

History
The Emporium was a department store founded in 1896 in San Francisco by Adolph Feist as a co-operative of individually owned shops in a building owned by the Parrott estate.  Then in 1897, through the efforts of Frederick W. Dohrmann, a German immigrant who arrived in California in the 1860s and had made a reputation in the general merchandise and flour milling industries in the Bay Area, a merger was orchestrated with the Golden Rule Bazaar, founded in the 1870s by the Davis Brothers.

In 1898, Dohrmann's son, A. B. C. Dohrman, became officially involved in day-to-day affairs and along with others was instrumental in the reorganization of the new Emporium; he was president of the company at the time  of the elder Dorhmann's death in 1914. In 1927, the Emporium merged with the Oakland-based department store H.C. Capwell, forming a new holding company, Emporium-Capwell Co., but retaining their respective identities. (Capwell founded his Oakland store in 1889 under the name The Lace House and changed it to his own name two years later.)

In the years after World War II, as the population of the Bay Area increased tremendously and spread out far beyond the urban cores of Oakland and San Francisco, several suburban branches of The Emporium were opened in newly developed shopping malls, mainly in San Mateo, Marin, Solano, Sonoma and Santa Clara counties. Capwell's focused its postwar suburban expansion closer to Oakland, opening branch stores in southern Alameda County and Contra Costa County.

Broadway-Hale Stores, later Carter Hawley Hale Stores, acquired Emporium-Capwell Co. in 1970, and consolidated its San Francisco Bay Area operation under the (still separate) Emporium and Capwell names, finally merging them in 1980 under the Emporium-Capwell name, later shortening the name to Emporium in 1990. In 1991, Emporium assumed operation of the Sacramento-based Weinstock's department store chain, which had a similar merchandising structure.

Finally in 1995 the chain and its parent (by then renamed Broadway Stores) were acquired by Federated Department Stores, which merged the Broadway, Emporium and Weinstock's stores with its own Macy's California and Bullock's stores to form Macy's West, renaming all the retained stores as Macy's. The Emporium location at Stanford Shopping Center was reopened by Federated's Bloomingdale's division in 1996, while after a decade of negotiation, bureaucratic red tape and intense physical reconstruction, the former flagship store of The Emporium on Market Street re-opened on September 28, 2006 as an expansion of the adjoining Westfield San Francisco Centre, which includes a new Bloomingdale's, the second-largest in the chain after its Manhattan flagship. The Emporium locations at The Shops at Tanforan and NewPark Mall became Target stores while Oakland, Hillsdale Shopping Center, and Solano Town Center locations became Sears. Almaden Plaza's location was subdivided into mixed retail use, with stores including Bed Bath & Beyond, Circuit City (now Buy Buy Baby), and Diddam's Party & Toy Store.

San Francisco and Oakland stores
The flagship location at 835 Market Street, between 4th and 5th Streets, was a destination for generations of northern California shoppers. It was designed by San Francisco architect Albert Pissis, one of the first Americans to be trained at the École des Beaux Arts in Paris. It withstood the 1906 earthquake, but was destroyed by the subsequent fire and rebuilt in 1908. Many additions and renovations were made in the decades following.  It was also well-known locally for the holiday carnival on its roof and the annual parade when Santa Claus arrived by stagecoach or cable car to open the holiday season.

In the late 1980s, the flagship Market Street store was connected to the new San Francisco Shopping Centre (now known as Westfield San Francisco Centre), a nine-story indoor mall anchored by a flagship Nordstrom location. The Emporium location closed permanently in February 1996, and after some controversy regarding the historic preservation of the building's facade and other elements, was redeveloped by Forest City Enterprises and The Westfield Group as an expansion of the existing San Francisco Centre with a West Coast flagship location of New York-based Bloomingdale's, which opened on September 28, 2006. The previously much-altered interior has been gutted and rebuilt to meet seismic standards and conform to modern retail configurations. The Emporium's historic domed glass roof was restored and is the centerpiece of the new facility.  The developers were fined $2.5 million for demolishing part of the tower and failing to preserve parts of the structure.

The H.C. Capwell flagship store is located at Broadway and 20th Street in downtown Oakland and opened in August 1929. The landmark structure suffered minor structural damage during the 1989 Loma Prieta earthquake and was closed for repairs, but reopened early 1990. It had been a landmark shopping destination for East Bay residents for decades. Emporium closed its doors in February 1996 and, in March, Sears assumed possession. It remained in operation as Sears until its sale and closure in the summer of 2014, when it was scheduled to be renovated and converted to a high-tech retail/office space. Uber bought the building in 2015 and renovated it under the name Uptown Station, with the office space to become the company headquarters, then sold it in December 2017 to CIM Group.

See also
 Emporium Capwell Company v. Western Addition:  1975 U.S. Supreme Court Case
City of Paris Dry Goods Co.
List of defunct department stores of the United States

References
Notes

Further reading
 Text of 2002 court filing relating to redevelopment of flagship location; provides brief historical notes
 "A hundred years of the Emporium in San Francisco"; SFGate.com feature (2011)

Defunct department stores based in the San Francisco Bay Area
Companies based in San Francisco
Demolished buildings and structures in San Francisco
Market Street (San Francisco)
Union Square, San Francisco
American companies established in 1896
Retail companies established in 1896
Retail companies disestablished in 1995
1896 establishments in California
1995 disestablishments in California
Defunct companies based in the San Francisco Bay Area
Macy's, Inc.
Sears Holdings